Frederick John Woodman (born 4 March 1997) is an English professional footballer who plays as a goalkeeper for EFL Championship club Preston North End.

Woodman started his career at Crystal Palace before moving to the academy setup at Newcastle United in 2013. He made his Newcastle debut on 6 January 2018 and has had other spells on loan to Hartlepool United, Crawley Town, Kilmarnock and Aberdeen.

Woodman has represented England up to U21 level, and has won the 2014 UEFA European Under-17 Championship and the 2017 FIFA U-20 World Cup with his country. He received the Golden Glove award for best goalkeeper in the latter tournament.

Club career

Early career
In 2013, Woodman joined Newcastle United from Crystal Palace, where his father Andy was goalkeeping coach at the time.

Loans to Hartlepool United and Crawley Town
On 16 September 2014, Woodman was sent on a month-long loan to Hartlepool United to gain experience of being in a first team environment. After six appearances as an unused substitute, Woodman returned to Newcastle.

On 29 July 2015, Woodman was sent on another loan spell to Crawley Town for half of the 2015–16 season. He made his debut for the team on 8 August 2015 in a 1–1 draw against Oxford United. When asked about his loan spell, Woodman said: "I'm really looking forward to it. It's a massive difference and it takes some getting used to, I'll take this experience back with me and say let's not come back here, let's play in the Premier League". Crawley manager Mark Yates said: "We are delighted to have been able to bring one of the best young goalkeepers in the country to the club. The only thing Freddie lacks at the moment is experience in League football and that is what this loan spell with give him. He has all the attributes to become a top-class keeper and I have to thank Steve McClaren, Andy Woodman and everyone at Newcastle for letting us have Freddie for the first half of the season". In October 2015, Newcastle recalled Woodman from his loan at Crawley after first choice keeper Tim Krul suffered a season ending knee injury. Woodman made 12 appearances during his spell with Crawley.

Newcastle United debut and loans in Scotland
On 9 January 2017, Woodman moved on loan to Scottish Premiership club Kilmarnock for the remainder of the season, along with Newcastle teammates Callum Roberts and Sean Longstaff. He made his debut on 21 January 2017, as Kilmarnock lost 1–0 against Hamilton Academical in the Scottish Cup. Woodman played regularly for Kilmarnock, keeping five clean sheets in 15 appearances. He left the club before the end of the season to play in the 2017 FIFA U-20 World Cup.

Woodman did not go out on loan during the first half of the 2017–18 season, although various clubs were interested in him following his success with the England under-20 team. After spending time on the bench for the first team, Woodman finally made his debut for Newcastle on 6 January 2018 in a 3–1 win over Luton Town in the third round of the FA Cup. On 31 January 2018, Woodman was loaned to Scottish Premiership club Aberdeen for the remainder of the season. Woodman made eight appearances whilst at Aberdeen.

With the permanent signing of Martin Dúbravka in the summer of 2018, Woodman was demoted to fourth-choice and asked to go out on loan again, but the club opted against sanctioning a loan deal.

Loans to Swansea City
On 1 August 2019, he moved on loan to Championship club Swansea City. He racked up 43 appearances as Swansea missed out on promotion to the Premier League in a 3–2 play-off semi-final aggregate defeat to Brentford.

On 16 August 2020, he moved back on loan to Swansea for the 2020–21 season.

Return to Newcastle United 
Woodman began the 2021-22 season ahead of senior goalkeepers Martin Dúbravka and Karl Darlow, starting on opening day at home to West Ham United and making further appearances for the next four games, including away to Manchester United. Woodman was sharply criticised following an error-prone afternoon at Old Trafford, where goalkeeping errors led to goals from Cristiano Ronaldo and Bruno Fernandes, ultimately leading to his eventual relegation to the bench.

Loan to AFC Bournemouth

On 31 January 2022, Woodman joined EFL Championship club AFC Bournemouth on loan for the remainder of the 2021–22 season.

Transfer to Preston North End 
On 21 June 2022, EFL Championship club Preston North End announced the signing of Woodman on a three year deal for an undisclosed fee.

International career
Woodman won the 2014 UEFA European Under-17 Championship with England, conceding two goals in 4 games and saving a penalty in the final of the tournament against the Netherlands. In the 2014–15 season, Woodman played up an age group with the England U19 side. Woodman was a member of the England squad for the 2016 UEFA European Under-19 Championship, starting in the semi-final defeat against Italy.

On 6 October 2016, Woodman made his debut at Under-21 level against Kazakhstan keeping a clean sheet in the process. He was selected in the England U20 squad for the 2017 FIFA U-20 World Cup, where he won the Golden Glove Award for the tournament's best goalkeeper, and saved a penalty in the final against Venezuela which England won 1–0.

Personal life
He is the son of former Brentford, Northampton Town, Oxford United and Colchester United goalkeeper Andy Woodman and his godfather is former England international defender and current England manager Gareth Southgate.

Career statistics

Honours
AFC Bournemouth
Championship runner-up: 2021–22

England U17
UEFA European Under-17 Championship: 2014

England U20
FIFA U-20 World Cup: 2017

England U21
Toulon Tournament: 2018

Individual
FIFA U-20 World Cup Golden Glove: 2017
Toulon Tournament Best XI: 2018
Toulon Tournament Best Goalkeeper: 2018
EFL Championship Golden Glove: 2020–21

References

External links

Profile  at the Newcastle United F.C. website
England profile at The Football Association website

1997 births
Living people
Footballers from Croydon
English footballers
England youth international footballers
England under-21 international footballers
Association football goalkeepers
Newcastle United F.C. players
Hartlepool United F.C. players
Crawley Town F.C. players
Kilmarnock F.C. players
Aberdeen F.C. players
Swansea City A.F.C. players
AFC Bournemouth players
Preston North End F.C. players
English Football League players
Scottish Professional Football League players
Premier League players